A general election was held in the U.S. state of Wyoming on Tuesday, November 2, 1926. All of the state's executive officers—the Governor, Secretary of State, Auditor, Treasurer, and Superintendent of Public Instruction—were up for election. Republicans narrowly picked up the governorship and solidified their control on the other statewide offices, increasing their margin of victory in each race.

Governor

Incumbent Democratic Governor Nellie Tayloe Ross ran for re-election to a second term. She was narrowly defeated for re-election by Republican Frank Emerson, the Wyoming State Engineer.

Secretary of State
Incumbent Republican Secretary of State Frank E. Lucas, who briefly served as acting governor following the death of William B. Ross, opted to run for Governor rather than seek re-election. Former Campbell County Clerk Alonzo M. Clark defeated former State Senator John Stansbury for the Republican nomination, while businessman W. S. Kimball won the Democratic nomination unopposed. In the general election, Clark defeated Kimball by a decisive margin to win his first term as Secretary of State.

Democratic primary

Candidates
 W. S. Kimball, businessman

Results

Republican primary

Candidates
 Alonzo M. Clark, former Campbell County Clerk
 John Stansbury, former State Senator
 W. K. Mylar

Results

General election

Results

Auditor
Incumbent Republican State Auditor Vincent Carter, first elected in 1922, ran for re-election to his second term. He faced newspaper editor Joe U. Allard, the Democratic nominee, in the general election. Despite the closeness of several other statewide races, Carter was able to improve on his margin of victory and defeated Allard in a landslide. He would not serve out his full term, however, following his election to Congress in 1928.

Democratic primary

Candidates
 Joe U. Allard, Evanston newspaper editor
 LeRoy Joyce, Deputy State Examiner

Results

Republican primary

Candidates
 Vincent Carter, incumbent State Auditor

Results

General election

Results

Treasurer
Incumbent Republican State Treasurer John M. Snyder declined to seek re-election to a second term. To replace him, former State Representative William H. Edelman, the Republican nominee, ran against C. H. McWinnie, the State Public Lands Commissioner and the Democratic nominee. Though Snyder's margin of victory in 1922 was close, Edelman ultimately defeated McWinnie by a wide margin.

Democratic primary

Candidates
 C. H. McWinnie, State Public Lands Commissioner

Results

Republican primary

Candidates
 William H. Edelman, former State Representative

Results

General election

Results

Superintendent of Public Instruction
Incumbent Republican Superintendent of Public Instruction Katharine A. Morton ran for re-election to a third term. She was opposed by Cecilia H. Hendricks, the Democratic nominee. Morton easily dispatched Hendricks to win re-election in a landslide, and in so doing, won the highest percentage of the vote of any candidate in the state in 1926.

Democratic primary

Candidates
 Cecilia H. Hendricks

Results

Republican primary

Candidates
 Katharine A. Morton, incumbent Superintendent of Instruction

Results

General election

Results

References

 
Wyoming